Francis White (born 26 May 1949) is a retired English Anglican bishop. He was Bishop of Brixworth and then the Assistant Bishop of Newcastle, in the Church of England.

Early life
White was educated at University College Cardiff, after which he was a social worker for nine years.

Ordained ministry
White was ordained in 1980 and was a curate at St Nicholas' Church, Durham and then hospital chaplain at the University Hospital of North Durham, vicar of Birtley, Rural Dean of Chester-le-Street and Archdeacon of Sunderland.

He has strong views on why fewer and fewer Anglicans regularly attend church.

Episcopal ministry
White was ordained to the episcopate in 2002 as the Bishop of Brixworth in the Diocese of Peterborough. For much of 2008 and 2009 he deputised for Ian Cundy, Bishop of Peterborough, before Cundy's death from cancer.

In May 2010 it was announced that White would become the Assistant Bishop of Newcastle from 28 November 2010. He retired on 30 September 2016.

Personal life

White is a supporter of his hometown football team, Newcastle United. He is a keen ornithologist.

White is married to Alison White, retired Bishop of Hull. They are the first husband and wife to both be bishops.

Styles
The Reverend Frank White (1980–1997)
The Venerable Frank White (1997–2002)
The Right Reverend Frank White (2002–present)

References

1949 births
People from Newcastle upon Tyne
Alumni of Cardiff Metropolitan University
Living people
Archdeacons of Sunderland
Bishops of Brixworth
Assistant bishops of Newcastle (1980–2016)
21st-century Church of England bishops